Sardar Asaad Bakhtiari (1856–1917), also known as Haj Ali-Gholi Khan, Sardar Asaad II (born Ali-Gholi Khan) was an Iranian revolutionary and a chieftain of the Bakhtiari Haft Lang tribe. The third son of Hossein Gholi Khan, he was one of the primary figures of the Persian Constitutional Revolution.

Life 
In 1909, Bakhtiari tribal forces under his command with the help of modern arms from the German Empire successfully captured Tehran as part of the revolutionary campaign to force the central government to establish democratic reforms. One of his descendants is living in Graz, Austria.

In the early 20th century, William Knox D'Arcy, by contract with Bakhtiari, obtained permission to explore for oil for the first time in the Middle East, an event which changed the history of the entire region.

See also
 Sepahsalar-e Tonekaboni, similar figure

References

External links
 Bakhtiaris and the Constitution — Photographs
 Genealogy of the Haft Lang branch of the Bakhtiaris
 Lily Sardarian Bakhtiari, Bakhtiaris and the Constitutional Revolution (A Summary)

1856 births
1917 deaths
19th-century Iranian politicians
People of the Persian Constitutional Revolution
Bakhtiari people
20th-century Iranian politicians